Denise Tual (née Piazza; 15 May 1906 – 23 November 2000), known as Denise Batcheff, was a French film editor and sound technician in the early 1930s.

She worked on nine films:
 Black and White (1931)
Amour à l'américaine (1931) also known as American Love (USA)
La Chienne (1931) (sound editor), directed by Jean Renoir
 Fantômas (1932), directed by Paul Fejos'
La Dame chez Maxim's (1933)
Lac aux dames (1934) also known as Lake of Ladies (USA)
L'Hôtel du libre échange (1934)
Zouzou (1934) (as D. Batcheff)
Les Beaux jours (1935)

She was married to Pierre Batcheff (1901–1932), a French actor whose most famous film was Un chien andalou (1929) by Luis Buñuel and Salvador Dalí.

External links
 

French film editors
1906 births
2000 deaths
Actresses from Paris
French women film editors
20th-century French women